Confidence is the sixth full-length studio recording from singer/songwriter/drummer/producer Narada Michael Walden. It was his first album wherein he co-wrote every single song with other people.

Track listing
"You're #1" (Narada Michal Walden, Allee Willis, Bob Castell Blanch, Frank Martin) 5:43
"Summer Lady" (N.M. Walden, Lisa Walden, Corrado "Pat" Rustici) 5:18
"I'm Ready" (N.M. Walden, Willis, Blanch) 4:20
"Safe in My Arms" (N.M. Walden, Jeffrey Cohen) 4:14
"Confidence" (N.M. Walden, Willis, Blanch) 4:01
"Holiday" (N.M. Walden, Willis) 4:27
"You Ought to Love Me" (N.M. Walden, Willis, Randy Jackson) 5:10
"Blue Side of Midnight" (N.M. Walden, Willis) 6:57

Personnel
Narada Michael Walden - drums
Corrado Rustici, Joe-Bob Castelle Blanch - guitar
Randy Jackson - bass
Frank Martin - keyboards

External links
Confidence at Discogs

1982 albums
Narada Michael Walden albums
Albums produced by Narada Michael Walden
Atlantic Records albums